Oleksandr Borysovych Holovko (born 6 January 1972) is a Ukrainian former footballer who played as a centre-back and current manager of Dinaz Vyshhorod. Holovko also used to be a regular start-up for the Ukraine national football team. He earned eight Ukrainian Vyshcha Liha titles with Tavriya Simferopol and Dynamo Kyiv.

Career
Holovko has played for three clubs, Tavriya Simferopol, Dynamo Kyiv and Qingdao Beilaite (P.R. China). A top notch central or right defender, Holovko helped lead Dynamo Kyiv to many victories in the UEFA Champions League, cumulating in a semifinal finish in 1998–1999. He was also a regular member of the Ukraine national football team from 1995 to 2004, having appeared in 58 international matches (among the cap leaders for Ukraine). As for playing his career, he stopped his career at the age 38.

Holovko started as a coach of the Ukrainian Under 16 Youth National Team. The team competed in September 2008 for qualification to the 2009 UEFA U-17 Championships.

References

External links
 

 Profile on website Football Ukraine

Ukrainian footballers
Ukraine international footballers
Ukrainian Premier League players
Ukrainian First League players
FC Dynamo Kyiv players
FC Dynamo-2 Kyiv players
SC Tavriya Simferopol players
Sportspeople from Kherson
Ukrainian expatriate footballers
Expatriate footballers in China
Ukrainian expatriate sportspeople in China
Qingdao Hainiu F.C. (1990) players
Chinese Super League players
1972 births
Living people
Ukraine national under-21 football team managers
Association football defenders
Ukrainian football managers
Ukrainian First League managers
FC Kremin Kremenchuk managers
FC Dinaz Vyshhorod managers